Cengkareng is a district (kecamatan) on West Jakarta, Indonesia. The Duri-Tangerang and Tangerang-Jakarta railways pass through Cengkareng.

Urban villages
The district of Cengkareng is divided into six kelurahan or urban villages:

Kedaung Kali Angke - area code 11710 
Kapuk - area code 11720 
Cengkareng Barat - area code 11730 
Cengkareng Timur - area code 11730 
Rawa Buaya - area code 11740 
Duri Kosambi - area code 11750

List of important places
 
Mookervaart Canal, a canal connecting the Cisadane River in Tangerang and Kali Angke in Jakarta. Constructed from 1678 to 1689, this 25-30 metre wide channel is one of the important flood control water channels in Jakarta.
Palapa Main Control Station

References

Districts of Jakarta
West Jakarta